The 2013 Chicago Fire season was the club's 18th year of existence, as well as their 16th season in Major League Soccer and their 16th consecutive year in the top-flight of American soccer.

Chicago Fire began the regular season on March 3, 2013 with an away match against the defending champions Los Angeles Galaxy.  The Men in Red concluded the regular season on October 27, 2013 with an away match against New York Red Bulls.

The Fire finished the regular season with a 14-13-7 record, but narrowly missed the playoffs, losing the spot to the Montreal Impact on second tiebreaker. On October 30, 2013, the club has announced the head coach Frank Klopas and the president of soccer operations Javier Leon have stepped down.

On December 5, 2013 the club's forward Mike Magee was named the MLS Most Valuable Player.

Squad at the end of the season 
As of October 27, 2013. Source: Chicago Fire official roster

Player movement

In 
Per Major League Soccer and club policies terms of the deals do not get disclosed.

Out 

Players selected in the 2013 MLS Supplemental Draft, but ultimately not signed by the club (in the order they were released): defender Caleb Konstanski (selected 68th overall in Supplemental Draft, fourth round, from Indiana University), defender John Gallagher (30th overall in Supplemental Draft, second round, from Penn State), goalkeeper James Belshaw (49th overall in Supplemental Draft, third round, from Duke).
Trialists who departed or were released in the preseason: midfielder Luke Boden, forward Sam Archer (winner of the Open Tryout), goalkeeper Ian Joyce, defender Rich Balchan, defender Eric Robertson, goalkeeper Neal Kitson, defender Rauwshan McKenzie, midfielder Borfor Carr, midfielder José Alexander Pabón, forward Blake Brettschneider, forward Dailos Tejera, forward Maxwell Griffin, forward Kevin Mercado, defender Pascal Chimbonda, defender Leo Lelis and forward Colin Rolfe.

Loans

In

Out 
Per Major League Soccer and club policies terms of the deals do not get disclosed.

Technical staff 

 Leo Percovich

Standings

Conference tables 

Eastern Conference

Western Conference

Overall table

Results summary

Results

Match results

Preseason

Major League Soccer 

Kickoff times are in CDT (UTC-05) unless shown otherwise

U.S. Open Cup 

Kickoff times are in CDT (UTC-05)

Friendlies 
Kickoff times are in CDT (UTC-05)

Recognition

Leading scorers

Updated to match played on October 27, 2013.Source: MLSsoccer.com statistics - 2013 Chicago Fire

MLS Team of the week

MLS Player of the week

MLS Player of the month

MLS All-star game

Team annual award winners 

Forward Mike Magee was named the team's Most Valuable Player, as well as the Golden Boot winner. Goalkeeper Sean Johnson was named the Defender of the year. These annual team award winners were selected by local media.

Daniel Paladini won the club's Goal of the Year award via online fan voting.

MLS season award winners 

Forward Mike Magee was named to the MLS Best XI and won the MLS Most Valuable Player Award.

Kits

Third kit 
On October 8, 2013 the club unveiled the third kit to be worn in the 2014 season. The municipal-themed design named "Heart on Your Sleeve" incorporated the city flag as well as the iconic Chicago skyline. The winning design was selected via a fan vote online.

Miscellany

International roster slots 
On January 4, 2013 Chicago has traded a 2013 International Roster Slot to New York Red Bulls in exchange for the midfielder Joel Lindpere.  On January 16, 2013 Chicago has traded another 2013 International Roster Slot to Colorado Rapids in exchange for Jeff Larentowicz, 11th pick in the 2013 MLS SuperDraft and allocation money.  Subsequently, Chicago Fire had six MLS International Roster Slots for use in the 2013 season.

Future draft pick trades 
Future picks acquired: 2014 MLS SuperDraft round 4 pick from Real Salt Lake in exchange for Kwame Watson-Siriboe.
Future picks traded: 2014 MLS SuperDraft second-round pick and allocation money to Philadelphia Union in exchange for defender Bakary Soumaré.  2014 MLS Supplemental Draft round 1 (which later was merged into 2014 MLS SuperDraft and became round 3) pick to Toronto FC in exchange for Quincy Amarikwa.

MLS rights to other players 
On February 4, 2013 Chicago Fire acquired the MLS rights to Robbie Rogers from Columbus Crew and subsequently traded them to Los Angeles Galaxy in exchange for Mike Magee.

References 

Chicago Fire FC seasons
Chicago Fire Soccer Club
Chicago Fire Soccer Club
Chicago Fire